Susan Partridge may refer to:

 Susan Partridge (athlete) (born 1980), British long-distance runner 
 Susan Partridge (tennis) (born 1930), British tennis player
 Susan Partridge, a character played by Amanda Donohoe in the film Foreign Body